Steven Robert William Leslie (born 4 September 1952) is an English former professional footballer who played as a midfielder.

Career
Leslie made over 500 appearances in all competitions for Colchester between 1971 and 1984. After leaving Colchester, Leslie played for Chelmsford City,  Brentwood Town and Wivenhoe Town. He now works for Brentwood Council.

Honours

Individual
 Colchester United Player of the Year (1): 1978

References

External links
 
 Steve Leslie at Colchester United Archive Database

1952 births
Living people
Association football midfielders
English footballers
Colchester United F.C. players
Chelmsford City F.C. players
Brentwood Town F.C. players
Wivenhoe Town F.C. players
English Football League players
Footballers from Hornsey